Itsa (from ) is a city in the Faiyum Governorate, Egypt. The city is located south of Faiyum. Its population was estimated at 74,000 people in 2021.

References 

Populated places in Faiyum Governorate